Dear Murderer is a 1947 British film noir crime, drama, thriller, directed by Arthur Crabtree for Gainsborough Pictures, and starring Eric Portman and Greta Gynt.

The film has come to be regarded as one of the best movies made under the supervision of Sydney Box at Gainsborough.

Plot
Lee and Vivien Warren are trapped in a nightmare marriage.  Vivien is despising, devious and habitually unfaithful while Lee is pathologically jealous. On his return from a lengthy business trip to New York, suspicious after his wife failed to write to him or call, Lee finds several cards addressed to Vivien signed "Love Always" and determines to kill her latest lover, Richard Fenton. He confronts Fenton, who admits to his affair with Vivien, and persuades him to end the relationship by writing her a farewell letter. He then kills Fenton, and stages the scene to look like a suicide, believing he has committed the perfect crime as the letter which Fenton had just written at his dictation has all the appearance of a suicide note.

His scheme goes awry when he discovers immediately after the fact that Vivien and Fenton had in fact broken up some time before, and Fenton had been humouring him by writing the note. He is guilt-stricken at having killed Fenton needlessly, and realises that any suggestion of suicide on Fenton's part in despair over Vivien will now seem absurd to the police. When he discovers that Vivien now has a new beau, Jimmy Martin, he takes the opportunity to frame Martin for the crime, reasoning that this will serve the dual purpose of shifting suspicion away from himself while at the same time getting Vivien's current lover out of the way. While he arranges matters so that all the evidence points to Martin, the policeman in charge of the case, Inspector Pembury, has his doubts about the case but is unable to catch Lee out.

Vivien begs her husband to intercede on Martin's behalf, promising to remain faithful in the future if he can devise a way to save Martin from the gallows without incriminating himself. Lee changes his testimony to the police to say that Fenton had died of suicide but that he had later manipulated the crime scene to look like he was murdered by Martin. Vivien convinces Lee to write a letter unbeknownst to him is intended to act as a suicide note. She gives him a drink containing an overdose of his regular medications. While Lee is dying, Vivien confesses to lying to him and that she only loved Martin. She attempts to reunite with Martin who wants nothing to do with her. Vivien returns dejectedly back to her apartment and, despite initially feigning distress at her husband's death, is arrested by Pembury for Lee's murder. Her lover Jimmy Martin's ring is given back to her stating 'til death do us part'. The film ends with her laughing cruelly, symbolising her downfall into madness.

Cast
 Eric Portman as Lee Warren
 Greta Gynt as Vivien Warren
 Dennis Price as Richard Fenton
 Maxwell Reed as Jimmy Martin
 Jack Warner as Insp. Pembury
 Hazel Court as Avis Fenton
 Jane Hylton as Rita
 Andrew Crawford as Sgt. Fox
 John Blythe as Ernie (uncredited)

Original play
The film was based on a play by St. John Legh Clowes. It debuted in a small theatre in London that had specialised in Grand Guignol plays and was so popular it was transferred to the West End in 1946, where it was a hit. Director Sam Woods wanted to buy the film rights. Film rights were purchased by Sydney Box.

There were plans to produce the play on Broadway starring Francis Lederer but this did not happen.

Production
It was one of the first films made at Gainsborough Pictures after Sydney Box took over as head of production. The adaptation was very faithful to the script.

Filming took place in late 1946. It was produced by Sydney's sister Betty.

The film was shot as Islington Studios.

The cast included two young actors whom Box was trying to build into stars, Maxwell Reed and Hazel Court. Both were from his acting company, The Company of Youth.

Reception
The film was well-received for its tautness and ingenuity, with one reviewer noting: "Dear Murderer is a shrewd, semi-psychological thriller with Eric Portman, a well-known menace...being sinister to the height of his bent.  The plot is good and chilling."  It also received positive notices on its release in the U.S.: "Another masterful picture from overseas, a carefully plotted dramatic thriller which revolves very neatly about the commission of the perfect crime."

The movie was given a Royal Command Performance in Oslo, Norway. (Star Greta Gynt was Norwegian.)

Attempted murder trial
The movie featured in a trial. Arthur Colyer was arrested for attempted murder of his wife. His wife was accused of passing off the plot for Dear Murderer as evidence, although she denied it.

Other versions of the play
The play was adapted for British TV in 1949 and 1957, and for German TV in 1972.

Dan O'Herlihy performed the role on stage in Los Angeles in 1955.

References

External links 
 
 
 
 
Review of film at Variety
Review of film at The New York Times
Dear Murderer 1949 BBC TV version at IMDb
Dear Murderer 1957 TV version at IMDb
Dear Murderer1972 German TV version at IMDb

1947 films
1940s crime films
British crime films
Gainsborough Pictures films
Films directed by Arthur Crabtree
British black-and-white films
Films with screenplays by Muriel Box
Films with screenplays by Sydney Box
Films produced by Betty Box
Films scored by Benjamin Frankel
Films with screenplays by Peter Rogers
Films set in London
1940s English-language films
1940s British films